Shaughnessy v. United States ex rel Mezei, 345 U.S. 206 (1953), was a United States Supreme Court case that established the federal government's power to detain migrants at the border pending deportation. The Supreme Court, in a five to four decision, held that the Attorney General's continued exclusion of the unauthorized immigrant without a hearing does not amount to an unlawful detention, and the court may not temporarily admit such individuals into the United States pending arrangements for their departure abroad. Some consider the decision in Shaughnessy v. United States ex rel Mezei as the Court's strongest statement of the plenary power doctrine as the power to permanently exclude noncitizens is based in U.S. sovereignty and largely immune from judicial control.

Background 
Ignatz Mezei arrived in the United States in 1923 and lived in Buffalo, New York as an unauthorized immigrant for 25 years. In 1948, Ignatz Mezei left his wife, four stepchildren, and a carpenter job to visit his dying mother in Romania. However, Mezei found himself unable to secure entry into Romania and decided to return to the United States. After spending 19 months overseas, Mezei was able to secure a quota immigration visa issued by the American Consul in Budapest, Hungary; then returning to the U.S. by a ship bound for Ellis Island. On February 9, 1950, Ignatz Mezei’s ship arrived and he was informed by an immigration inspector that he was temporarily excluded from the U.S. due to the Passport Act of 1918, as amended. While the formal charges and evidence against Mezei were unknown to him, he was aware that the IRS wanted to exclude him due to his activities with the Hungarian lodge of the Internal Workers Order (IWO). Prior to his exclusion hearing, Mezei’s attorney met with a Justice Department official who disclosed the government alleged Mezei was excludable on three grounds:

 That Mezei was a member of the Communist Party at some point during 1929-1945;
 Mezei was convicted of a crime involving moral turpitude (petty larceny in 1935);
 That the information he provided to consular officers in Hungary to obtain an immigrant quota visa was false.

However, Mezei was not provided with the evidence the government had against him. Ignatz Mezei was detained for two years on Ellis Island without bail by order of the Attorney General before filing a writ of habeas corpus to the District Court. The District Court held that Mezei would be granted a $5000 bail and the Court of Appeals approved; the Supreme Court then granted certiorari.

Issues  
On March 16, 1953, Justice Clark delivered the opinion of the Court. The issues held by the Court include:

 The denial of a retrial in exclusion cases after the Attorney General’s statutory determination that the immigrants entry would be prejudicial to the public interest.
 Neither an immigrant's harborage on Ellis Island nor their prior residence in the U.S. grants anything other than an exclusion proceeding.
 Lawful resident immigrants may not be deprived of their constitutional rights to due process; however, Ignatz Mezei is an “entrant alien” or “assimilated to that status” for constitutional purposes.
 Therefore, the Attorney General may exclude Mezei without a hearing, as authorized by the emergency regulations under the Passport Act, need not disclose the evidence upon which the determination rests.
 Mezei’s continued detention on Ellis Island does not deprive him of any statutory or constitutional right.
 Mezei’s right to enter the United States depends solely on congressional will; the courts cannot substitute their judgment for the legislative mandate.

The major holdings in this case include treating Mezei, a noncitizen resident of the U.S. for 25 years, no differently than a noncitizen seeking admission for the first time, that Mezei’s continued and possibly indefinite exclusion on Ellis Island does not deprive him of any statutory or constitutional right, and that Mezei’s exclusion is a fundamental sovereign attribute dependent on congressional will and largely immune from the courts.

Opinion of the Court 
Justice Clark gave the opinion of the Court. Justice Clark reaffirmed the right for the government to exclude Ignatz Mezei as a fundamental sovereign attribute exercised by the Government’s political departments largely immune from judicial control, citing the precedent cases of The Chinese Exclusion Case, Fong Yue Ting v. United States, Knauff v. Shaughnessey, and Harisiades v. Shaughnessey. Due to the plenary power of the legislature in immigration, Mezei was lawfully excluded under the expressed authority of Congress, authorizing the president to impose additional restrictions on noncitizen entry under the Passport Act. The Passport Act, originally enacted in 1918, authorized the additional restrictions on the entry or exit of noncitizens during periods of international tension or strife. The international tension or strife that authorized the exclusion of Mezei was the post-World War II Red Scare (1947–1957). Under the Passport Act, the Court held that the Attorney General made the necessary decision to exclude Mezei from entering the United States without a hearing due to Mezei’s entry being prejudicial to the public interest.

Regarding the 25 years that Ignatz Mezei was a resident noncitizen of the United States, the Court held that neither Mezei’s harborage on Ellis Island nor his prior residence here grants Mezei anything except an exclusion hearing. Justice Clark found that Mezei left the United States without any authorization or reentry papers and remained “behind the Iron Curtain” for 19 months. Therefore, the Court held that the status of Mezei is that of newly arrived noncitizens or “assimilated to that status” for constitutional purposes.

Due to the Court finding that Ignatz Mezei’s release into the United States would be prejudicial to the public interest, his continued exclusion on Ellis Island is a pressing issue. The Court reaffirmed Congress’s meticulously specified statute shelter ashore the U.S., including Ellis Island, is not considered a landing and, therefore, grants no additional rights or protections. Thus, the Court will treat him as if he had been stopped at the border for constitutional purposes, he can be turned back at the border with nothing more. In this final holding, the Court stated that Ignatz Mezei’s continued exclusion on Ellis Island does not deprive him of any statutory or constitutional right.

Dissents 
In the narrow five to four decision, four Justices join the dissenting opinion. Justice Black, with whom Justice Douglas concurs, emphasizes that Ignatz Mezei’s continued imprisonment without a hearing violated due process of the law. In this case, due process has been violated because “neither the federal police nor the federal prosecutors nor any other governmental official, whatever his title, can put or keep people in prison without accountability to courts of justice.” Therefore, the dissenters hold that Mezei has been deprived of his individual liberty indefinitely due to the denial of a fair open court hearing where the evidence is evaluated by the court, not the prosecutor.

The final two dissenters, Justice Jackson joined by Justice Frankfurter, further emphasize Ignatz Mezei’s denial of liberty and expand on the denial of due process of the law. The federal government states that Mezei was not denied liberty or due process because his imprisonment was simply exclusion from the United States and he could depart to another country at any time. The dissenter's response to this claim was, “That might mean freedom, if only he were an amphibian!” In their opinion, Mezei was unjustly incarcerated and effectively kept as a prisoner by the forces of U.S. immigration authority. Although, Justice Jackson and Justice Frankfurter were cautious in saying that the concept of due process does not forbid all preventative detention of potentially dangerous noncitizens. Expanding on this point, the dissenters stated that in situations where indefinite confinement becomes the means to enforcing exclusion, such as in Mezei’s case, due process of the law requires the noncitizen to have a fair open court hearing where transparency is given on the charges against the individual.

References 

1953 in United States case law
United States Supreme Court cases
United States Supreme Court cases of the Vinson Court